Wolf Pen Hollow is a valley in McDonald County in the U.S. state of Missouri.

Wolf Pen Hollow took its name from the wolf pen, a device used to trap wolves.

References

Valleys of McDonald County, Missouri
Valleys of Missouri